The 1975 Palestine Cup was the 3rd edition of the Palestine Cup of Nations, it was held in Tunisia between 19 and 28 December. Ten nations took part in the competition of which Egypt won.

Participated teams
The 10 participated teams are:

Squads

Group stage

Group A

Group B

Group C

Group D

Knockout stage

Semi-finals

3rd place playoff

Final

Result

External links
 RSSSF archives

1975
1975
1975 in Tunisian sport
1975 in Asian football
1975 in African football